Aleksandar Markoski (Serbian Cyrillic: Александар Маркоски; born 17 September 1975) is a Serbian former football player.

See also
Football in Serbia
List of football clubs in Serbia

References

External sources
 

Living people
1975 births
Sportspeople from Zrenjanin
Serbian footballers
FK Bežanija players
FK Hajduk Kula players
FK Banat Zrenjanin players
FK Proleter Zrenjanin players
Serbian SuperLiga players
Association football midfielders